Dimtu or Wolaita Dimtu or Bilate Tena is a town in south-central Ethiopia. It has an elevation between 1,000 and 1,600 metres above sea level. It was part of the former Damot Weyde (Woreda) of Wolayita Zone, near to Sodo Zuria woreda. It is now under the Diguna Fango woreda. Some writers mention the town as Bilate Tena in their books and journals. Among them, Getahun Garedew, former Head Officer in Education Bureau of Southern Nations, Nationalities, and Peoples' Region, and State Minister of Ministry of Education since 2020, is the anterior. In the book "Local Adaptation Practices in Response to Climate Change in the Bilate River Basin, Southern Ethiopia", he used these two names, Dimtu and Bilate Tena, in a similar way.

History 
David Buxton stated in his book that Dimtu was the name of a market, and it was near the Bilate River. As unwritten source reveals that the name was derived from the word "Danttuwa", which in Wolaytta language means the junction. It was named so because the market is located, where Bilate River and the "Qocuwaa" river, which is from Dimtu town, meet.

Dimtu is the oldest town in the Wolaita Zone, next to Sodo, the capital of Wolaita. About 81% of town has electric coverages. The town is almost covered by asphalt roads, and is located 333 KM from Addis Ababa to the South-West, and 68 KM from Sodo.

Demographics 
Based on the 2018 population projection by the Central Statistical Agency of Ethiopia, Dimtu has a total population of 25,294, of whom 15,855 are men and 9,439 are women. The majority of the inhabitants were Protestants (94.61%) and 4.10% practiced Ethiopian Orthodox Christianity, 0.0076% were Muslims, and 1.28% were Catholics.

Education 

The city has schools from primary (Bilate Tena Primary School) to high school (Bilate Tena Secondary and Preparatory School). The primary school is the very oldest one when compered to the secondary and preparatory school of the town. It is one of the primary school that established in 1940's after the revolution in the period of Haile Selassie I for education. By this time, it's reported that about 400 primary schools established all over the country and Bilate Tena Primary school is among them.

Bilate Tena Secondary and Preparatory School was established in 2009 and got ready for its duty in 2010 as it was opened by Ambassador Teshome Toga, who was raised in the Dimtu area. 

For the schools are in the border, its compound well known by its multicultural environment and made a great relationship with the neighbors, Sidama people and Oromia people as well.

Climate 
The town is located lowland, and its temperature lie between 14 to 30°C in summer, and 8 to 24°C in winter.

References 

Populated places in the Southern Nations, Nationalities, and Peoples' Region
Cities and towns in Wolayita Zone
Cities and towns in Ethiopia
Ethiopia